is a former Japanese football player.

Playing career
Umeda was born in Fuchu, Hiroshima on April 27, 1978. After graduating from Meiji University, he joined J1 League club Sanfrecce Hiroshima based in his local in 2001. He played many matches from first season. However Sanfrecce was relegated to J2 League end of 2002 season. In 2004, he moved to J1 club Urawa Reds. However he could hardly play in the match. In September 2004, he moved to J2 club Montedio Yamagata on loan. He played all 12 matches until end of the season. In 2005, he returned to Urawa Reds. However he could not play at all in the match. In June 2005, he moved to J2 club Shonan Bellmare. Although he played many matches in 2005 season, he could not play many matches for injury from 2006. In 2009, he moved to Japan Football League club Gainare Tottori. Although he could not play many matches for injury until summer 2010, he became a regular player in summer 2010. Gainare also won the champions in 2010 season and was promoted to J2. In 2012, he moved to FC Gifu. He retired end of 2012 season.

Club statistics

References

External links

1978 births
Living people
Meiji University alumni
Association football people from Hiroshima Prefecture
Japanese footballers
J1 League players
J2 League players
Japan Football League players
Sanfrecce Hiroshima players
Urawa Red Diamonds players
Montedio Yamagata players
Shonan Bellmare players
Gainare Tottori players
FC Gifu players
Association football forwards